Stealing Christmas is an American made for television comedy-drama film directed by Gregg Champion and starring Tony Danza, Lea Thompson and Angela Goethals. It premiered on USA Network in 2003.  It was later broadcast in the 25 Days of Christmas programming block on ABC Family (now Freeform) and in 2020 it was part of Freeform's Kickoff to Christmas.

Plot
A burglar (Tony Danza) plans a bank heist in a small town on Christmas Eve, but experiences a change of heart after he takes a job playing Santa Claus.

Cast
 Tony Danza as Jack Clayton
 Lea Thompson as Sarah Gibson
 Angela Goethals as Noelle Gibson 
 Betty White as Emily Sutton
 David Parker as Harry Zordich 
 Malcolm Stewart as Doug Jennings 
 Alf Humphreys as Tim Hogan (as Alfred E. Humphreys)
 Gwynyth Walsh as Jo
 Damon Gregory as Store Guard
 Dean Redman as Store Guard
 Brad Sihvon as Store Guard
 Terry Howson as Store Guard
 Beverly Elliott as Woman Outside Store
 Michael Scholar Jr. as Bus Ticket Seller
 Richard Hendery as Bus Driver
 Ryan Steele as Teenager on Bus
 Alvin Sanders as Cook
 Ryan Hirakida as Pudgy Kid
 Isabelle Deluce as Girl #1
 Owen Seidel as Crying Kid
 Lisa Bunting as School Teacher
 Effi Markovitch as Gary Tannenbaum
 Spancer Achtymichuk as Andrew
 Alexis Llewellyn as Girl #2
 Cameron Cowles as Kid
 Avery Marte as Kid
 Michaela Slinger as Kid
 Avery Tiplady as Kid
 Kayden Porbeni as Kid
 Zachary Bergman as Kid
 Julia Tortolano as Kid
 Nico McEown as Kid 
 Don Mackay as Bank Manager
 Howard Storey as Bank Guard
 Colin Cunningham as Mall Security Guard
 Terry O'Sullivan as Bank Teller
 Cameron Park as Policeman
 Perry Finnbogason as Little Boy with Glasses
 Jodie Graham as Boy's Father
 French Tickner as Minister
 John Carroll as Judge 
 D. Harlan Cutshall as Prison Guard
 Rob Morton as Prison Guard

See also
 List of American films of 2003
 List of Christmas films
 Santa Claus in film

References

External links
 
 
 

2003 television films
2003 films
2003 crime drama films
American crime drama films
American Christmas drama films
USA Network original films
Christmas television films
2000s Christmas drama films
Films directed by Gregg Champion
2000s American films